Aegiphila panamensis is a species of flowering plant in the family Lamiaceae. It is native to the Americas, its distribution extending from Mexico to Colombia.

Description
The inflorescence is a panicle of flowers. Each flower has a fuzzy, tubular, cream or yellowish corolla just under a centimeter long.

References

panamensis
Flora of Central America
Flora of Mexico
Flora of Colombia
Vulnerable plants
Taxonomy articles created by Polbot
Plants described in 1931